Axford is a hamlet in the Basingstoke and Deane district of Hampshire, England.

Governance
The hamlet of Axford is part of the civil parish of Nutley, which is part of the parish council of Preston Candover and Nutley. It is also part of the Upton Grey and the Candovers ward of Basingstoke and Deane borough council. The borough council is a Non-metropolitan district of Hampshire County Council.

References

External links

Villages in Hampshire